Intraflagellar transport protein 88 homolog is a protein that is encoded by the IFT88 gene.

Function 

This gene encodes a member of the tetratrico peptide repeat (TPR) family. Mutations of a similar gene in mouse can cause polycystic kidney disease. Two transcript variants encoding distinct isoforms have been identified for this gene. In 2012 a mutation was found to be responsible for a novel form of ciliopathy and anosmia in humans capable of remedy in mice by adenoviral mediated gene therapy.

Interactions 

IFT88 has been shown to interact with BAT2 and WDR62. WDR62 is required for IFT88 localization to the cilia basal body and the cilia axoneme.

References

Further reading